The UCI Road World Championships - Men's under-23 road race is the annual world championship for road bicycle racing in the discipline of time trial, organised by the world governing body, the Union Cycliste Internationale. The event was first run in 1996. In 2020 no race was held due to the COVID-19 pandemic.

Medal winners

Medallists by nation

References

 
Men's under-23 road race
Men's road bicycle races
Lists of UCI Road World Championships medalists
Under-23 cycle racing